This is a list of Filipino desserts. Filipino cuisine consists of the food, preparation methods and eating customs found in the Philippines. The style of cooking and the food associated with it have evolved over many centuries from its Austronesian origins to a mixed cuisine of Malay, Spanish, Chinese, and American influences adapted to indigenous ingredients and the local palate.

Philippine desserts

  Alfajor - Dulce de Leche sandwich cookie  
  Apas  - Sugar crusted biscuits 
  Bakpia - Bean paste filled moon cake 
  Bananacue - Carmelised, fried plantain skewers
  Baye baye  - Rolled pudding of coconut and rice or corn flour
  Belekoy - chewy candy strips dotted with sesame
  Bibingka - Christmas time coconut-rice cake
  Biko - Fudge like rice cake flavoured with caramel, ginger and coconut milk
  Binatog - A street food of boiled corn topped with grated coconut, sugar and butter
  Biskotso - Twice-baked bread slices coated with butter, sugar and sometimes garlic.
 Brazo de Mercedes - a rolled meringue cake filled with a custard
  Bukayo  - coconut noodles cooked in caramel 
  Buko pie – a traditional baked young-coconut (malauhog) custard pie 
  Camote cue  - Deep fried and caramelised skewers of camote (sweet potato) slices 
  Cascaron 
  Caycay
  Crema de fruta 
  Cassava cake
  Donat Bai
  Dodol 
  Espasol 
  Ginanggang 
  Ginataan
  Guinomis 
  Gulaman 
  Halo-halo 
  Inipit
  Kalamay 
  Kutsinta 
  Latik 
  Leche flan
  Maíz con hielo 
  Maja blanca 
  Mango float
  Maruya 
  Nata de coco 
  Otap 
  Palitaw 
  Pastillas
  Piaya 
  Pitsi-pitsî 
  Polvorón 
  Roscas 
  Sans rival
  Sapin-sapin 
  Silvana
  Sorbetes – the traditional variation of ice cream made in the Philippines, it is uniquely made from coconut milk, unlike other iced desserts that are made from animal milk.
  Suman 
  Taho 
  Turón
  Ube ice cream

See also

 List of desserts
 List of Philippine dishes

References

 
Philippine
Food and Drink
Philippine